"Angel by the Wings" is a song by Sia, from the Otto Bell documentary film, The Eagle Huntress soundtrack.

Background and release
The song was reported by Billboard in January 2016 as being specifically written and recorded by Sia for the "coming-of-age film" which premiered at the Sundance Film Festival on 24 January 2016. Otto Bell said: I'm incredibly grateful that Sia took the time to write and record this very special song. It's a wonderful vote of confidence for our documentary. I could not have imagined a more fitting, timeless piece of music for the film - it's such a beautiful girl power anthem!

The single was released on 2 December 2016.

Critical reception
Gil Kaufman from Billboard described the song as "inspirational" and "appropriately soaring" to complement the story in the film.

Ben Kaye from Consequence of Sound described the song as "one of booming empowerment and triumph, with a simple but effective refrain of, 'You can do anything.

Charts

References

2016 singles
2016 songs
Sia (musician) songs
Song recordings produced by Greg Kurstin
Songs written by Sia (musician)
Songs written by Greg Kurstin
Songs written for films